Events in the year 2023 in Morocco.

Incumbents
 King: Mohammed VI
 Prime Minister of Morocco: Aziz Akhannouch

Events

January

Sports
 February 1 – February 11: 2022 FIFA Club World Cup in Morocco.

Deaths
January 2: Death of Moroccan comedian Abderrahim Tounsi known as "Abderraouf"

See also

 Western Sahara
 Sahrawi Arab Democratic Republic
 COVID-19 pandemic in Africa
 2020s
 African Union
 Berber languages
 Republic of the Rif
 Arab League
 Morocco–United States relations

References

 
2020s in Morocco
Years of the 21st century in Morocco
Morocco
Morocco